Kevin Kaminski (born March 13, 1969) is a former Canadian ice hockey player, notable for being one of the most prominent minor-league "goons" of the 1990s. He is currently the head coach of the La Ronge Ice Wolves of the Saskatchewan Junior Hockey League.

Playing career
Selected in the 1987 NHL Entry Draft by the Minnesota North Stars, Kaminski only played one game for the North Stars before he was traded to the Quebec Nordiques in exchange for Gaetan Duchesne. After spending several years in the Nordiques organization, principally for their Halifax Citadels AHL team, he was traded to the Washington Capitals prior to the 1993–94 NHL season.

During his four seasons with the Capitals, his hard-nosed style of play would make him a fan favorite, as he would not hesitate to fight players much bigger than he was. He would play three more seasons in the minors for the Portland Pirates of the American Hockey League before retiring in 1999.

Although Kaminski played only 286 games in the AHL, less than four full seasons' worth, he stands in the top 50 in all-time career penalty minutes for the league.

Coaching career
After retiring from playing, Kaminski moved on to coaching starting as an assistant with the Cincinnati Mighty Ducks in 2000. He got his first head coaching position in 2002 with the Long Beach Ice Dogs in the West Coast Hockey League where he stayed for two seasons before being released. He has since coached for the Missouri River Otters (UHL), Youngstown SteelHounds (CHL), Mississippi RiverKings (CHL), Louisiana IceGators (SPHL), and the Louisiana Drillers (NA3HL). In October 2016, he took the head coaching position with the Fresno Monsters of the Western States Hockey League, a Tier II junior team. After three seasons in Fresno, he returned to Saskatchewan and the head coaching position with the La Ronge Ice Wolves.

Kaminski won the CHL's coach of the year award with the Mississippi RiverKings in the 2008–09 season.

References

External links

1969 births
Canadian ice hockey defencemen
Ice hockey people from Saskatchewan
Las Vegas Thunder players
Living people
Minnesota North Stars draft picks
Minnesota North Stars players
Portland Pirates players
Quebec Nordiques players
Saskatoon Blades players
Washington Capitals players
New England Stingers players